Bronson Creek Airport  was an airport in Bronson Creek, British Columbia, Canada.

The airport was built to service the Snip Gold Mine which closed in 1999. The Transport Canada location identifier is now used by Abbotsford (Regional Hospital & Cancer Centre) Heliport.

References

Defunct airports in British Columbia